Igor Macypura (: Ihor Matsypura or Igor Matsipura; born 10 April 1985) is a Ukrainian figure skater who competed internationally for Slovakia. He is the 2008 Triglav Trophy silver medalist, the 2008 International Cup of Nice bronze medalist, the 2006 Ondrej Nepela Memorial bronze medalist, and a three-time Slovak national champion. He qualified to the free skate at five ISU Championships.

Personal life
Macypura was born on 10 April 1985 in Kyiv, Ukrainian SSR, Soviet Union. He moved to the United States at an early age.

Career
Macypura appeared twice at the U.S. Figure Skating Championships, representing the Peninsula Skating Club. Competing on the junior level at the 2004 U.S. Championships, he won the short program but placed ninth in the free skate to finish eighth overall.

Macypura competed at the 2005 Slovak Championships and won the national title. He began representing Slovakia internationally in the 2005–06 season. At the 2005 Karl Schäfer Memorial, the last Olympic qualifying competition, he placed 8th and qualified a spot to the 2006 Winter Olympics in Turin. However, the Slovak Olympic Committee decided not to send him.

Macypura won the bronze medal at the 2006 Ondrej Nepela Memorial, silver at the 2008 Triglav Trophy, and bronze at the 2008 International Cup of Nice. He appeared at three Grand Prix events – 2008 Skate America, 2008 Trophee Eric Bompard, and 2009 Skate America. He also competed at four European and four World Championships, qualifying to the free skate five times – at the 2007 Europeans in Warsaw, 2007 Worlds in Tokyo, 2008 Worlds in Gothenburg, 2009 Europeans in Helsinki, and 2009 Worlds in Los Angeles.

Macypura finished second to Peter Reitmayer in a Slovak internal competition to determine the skater who would compete at the 2009 Nebelhorn Trophy, the final qualifying opportunity for the 2010 Winter Olympics in Vancouver.

Programs

Competitive highlights
GP: Grand Prix

For Slovakia

In the United States

References

External links

 

Slovak male single skaters
1985 births
Living people
Sportspeople from Kyiv
Ukrainian emigrants to the United States
People from Artesia, California